Morgan Township is one of twelve townships in Porter County, Indiana. As of the 2010 census, its population was 3,684.

History
Morgan Township was organized in 1843.

Cities and towns
The unincorporated community of Malden is the only town within the township.

Education
Morgan Township is served by the East Porter County School Corporation.  The high school is Morgan Township Middle-High School, located north of Malden on State Route 49.

Cemeteries

References

External links
 Indiana Township Association
 United Township Association of Indiana

Townships in Porter County, Indiana
Townships in Indiana